The Bachelor's Swan Song is a 1989 Hong Kong movie directed by Derek Yee.

Cast
 Kenny Bee as Chan Chi-Nam
 Maggie Cheung as Cheung Yuk
 Lydia Shum as Yuk's Mother
 Meg Lam as Ming
 Lawrence Cheng as Tan

Awards and nominations
Nominated – Hong Kong Film Award for Best Screenplay at the 9th Hong Kong Film Awards

External links
 
 The Bachelor's Swan Song on Hong Kong Cinemagic

Hong Kong romantic comedy films
1989 films
Films directed by Derek Yee
Films set in Hong Kong
Films shot in Hong Kong
1980s Hong Kong films